No Holiday is the seventh and final studio album by American punk rock band The Muffs. It was released on October 18, 2019 under Omnivore Recordings.

The album was the band's final release due to the death of lead vocalist Kim Shattuck on October 2, 2019.

Critical reception

No Holiday was met with "universal acclaim" reviews from critics. At Metacritic, which assigns a weighted average rating out of 100 to reviews from mainstream publications, this release received an average score of 84, based on 7 reviews.

Accolades

Track listing

Personnel

Musicians
 Kim Shattuck – vocals, guitar, producer
 Ronnie Barnett – bass, vocals
 Kristian Hoffman – keyboard
 Roy McDonald – drums, percussion
 Melanie Vammen – organ

Production
 Greg Allen – design
 Karen Basset – engineer
 Ailin G. Caraballo – photographer
 Erik Eldenius – engineer
 Evan Frankfort – mixer
 Steve Holroyd – engineer
 Brad Vance – mastering

Charts

References

External links

2019 albums
The Muffs albums
Omnivore Recordings albums